Marmottan may refer to:

 Musée Marmottan Monet
 Anémone Marmottan (b. 1988), French alpine skier